Henry Island may refer to:
 Henry Ice Rise, an ice rise in the Ronne Ice Shelf, Antarctica
 Henry Island, Antigua and Barbuda, an island in Antigua and Barbuda
 Henry Island (India), an island in India
 Henry Island (North Channel), an  island in North Channel, Ontario
 Henry Island (Nova Scotia), an island in Nova Scotia
 Henry Island (Washington), an island in the San Juan Islands

See also
Henry Lawrence Island
Henry Islands, a group of four small islands in the western part of Henry Bay, Antarctica